St. Helens South and Whiston is a constituency created in 2010 represented in the House of Commons of the UK Parliament by Marie Rimmer of the Labour Party.

History
Creation
Following the Fifth Periodic Review of Westminster constituencies the Boundary Commission for England expanded and renamed the St Helens South seat, covering the south of the Metropolitan Borough of St Helens and three wards of the Knowsley borough which were in a neighbouring seat.

Results of the winning party
The area has been held by the Labour Party since the 1945 election (including predecessor seats), and part since 1935. The 2015 result made the seat the 24th safest of Labour's 232 seats by percentage of majority.

Results of other parties
The 2015 general election saw (with 11.3%) more than the national average swing (+9.5%) to UKIP (narrowly placed third). Labour's candidate won more than fivefold those votes, scoring 59.8%.

Turnout
Turnout has risen from 59.1% to 62.3%

Boundaries

The boundaries have not changed to date.

Its electoral wards are:

From Knowsley: Prescot East, Whiston North and Whiston South
From St Helens: Bold, Eccleston, Rainhill, Sutton, Thatto Heath, Town Centre and West Park.

Members of Parliament

Elections

Elections in the 2010s

* Served as an MP in the 2005–2010 Parliament

See also
List of parliamentary constituencies in Merseyside

Notes

References

Politics of the Metropolitan Borough of St Helens
Parliamentary constituencies in North West England
Constituencies of the Parliament of the United Kingdom established in 2010